This list of the prehistoric life of Florida contains the various prehistoric life-forms whose fossilized remains have been reported from within the US state of Florida.

Precambrian
The Paleobiology Database records no known occurrences of Precambrian fossils in Florida.

Paleozoic
 †Actinopteria
  †Acutiramus
 †Acutiramus suwaneensis
 †Arisaigia
 †Arisaigia postornata – or unidentified comparable form
 †Butovicella
 †Butovicella migrans
  †Colpocoryphe
 †Colpocoryphe exsul
 †Conularia
 †Eoschizodus
 †Modiomorpha
 †Plectonotus
 †Pleurodapis
 †Prothyris
 †Pterinopecten
  †Pterygotus
 †Pterygotus floridanus
 †Tentaculites

Mesozoic

The Paleobiology Database records no known occurrences of Mesozoic fossils in Florida.

Cenozoic

Selected Cenozoic taxa of Florida

 †Abra
 Acanthocardia
 Acanthochitona
 Acar
 Accipiter
 †Accipiter cooperii
  †Accipiter striatus
 Acer
 †Acer rubrum
 †Acmaturris
 Acris
 †Acris gryllus – or unidentified comparable form
  †Acritohippus
 †Acritohippus isonesus
 Acropora
 †Acropora cervicornis
 †Acropora palmata
 Acrosterigma
 Acteocina
 Acteon
 Actitis
 †Actitis macularia
 Aegolius
 †Aegolius acadicus
  †Aelurodon
  †Aepycamelus
 †Aepycamelus major
 Aequipecten
 Aesopus
 Aetobatus
 †Aetobatus narinari
 Agaricia
 †Agaricia agaricites
 Agaronia
 Agassizia
 Agatrix
 Agelaius
 †Agelaius phoeniceus
 Agkistrodon
  †Agkistrodon piscivorus
 Agladrillia
 †Agnotocastor
 †Agriotherium
 Aix
 †Aix sponsa
 Ajaia
 †Ajaia ajaja
 Alaba
 Alabina
 Alca – type locality for genus
  †Aletomeryx
   Alligator
 †Alligator mississipiensis
  †Alligator mississippiensis
 †Alligator olseni – type locality for species
 Alnus
 Alosa
 Alveopora
 Amauropsis – report made of unidentified related form or using admittedly obsolete nomenclature
 †Ambystoma
 †Ambystoma tigrinum
  †Amebelodon
 Americardia
 †Americardia media
 Amia
 †Amia calva
 Ammodramus
 †Ammodramus maritimus
 †Ammodramus savannarum
 Amnicola
 †Amphicyon
  †Amphimachairodus
 †Amphiroa
 Amphistegina
 Amphiuma
 †Amphiuma means
 †Amplibuteo
 †Amplibuteo woodwardi
 †Ampullina
 †Ampullinopsis
 Amusium
 †Anabernicula
 Anachis
 Anadara
  †Anadara floridana
 †Anadara ovalis
 †Anadara transversa
 †Anadara trapezia
 Anas
 †Anas acuta
 †Anas americana
 †Anas carolinensis
 †Anas clypeata
 †Anas crecca
 †Anas cyanoptera – or unidentified comparable form
 †Anas discors
 †Anas fulvigula
 †Anas platyrhynchos
 †Anas rubripes
 †Anas strepera
 Anatina
  †Anchitherium
 Ancilla
 Angulus
 Anhinga
 †Anhinga anhinga
 Anodonta
 Anodontia
 †Anodontia alba
 Anolis
  †Anolis carolinensis
 Anomia
 †Anomia simplex
 Anona
 Antalis
 Anticlimax
 Antigona
 Antillophos
 †Antillophos candeanus – or unidentified comparable form
 Antrozous
 Aorotrema
 †Aorotrema cistronium
 Apalone
 †Apalone ferox
 Aphelocoma
 †Aphelocoma coerulescens
  †Aphelops
 Aphera
 Aquila
 †Aquila chrysaetos
 †Aramides
 †Aramides cajanea
 Aramus
 †Aramus guarauna
 Arbacia
 Arca
 †Arca imbricata
  †Arca zebra
 †Archaeohippus
 Architectonica
 †Archosargus
 †Archosargus probatocephalus
 Arcinella
 †Arcinella arcinella
 †Arcinella cornuta
  †Arctodus
 †Arctodus pristinus
 †Arctonasua
 Ardea
  †Ardea herodias
 Ardeola
 Argobuccinum – report made of unidentified related form or using admittedly obsolete nomenclature
 Argopecten
 †Argopecten gibbus
  †Argopecten irradians
 Arius
 Artena
 Asio
 †Asio flammeus
 Aspella
 †Aspella senex – type locality for species
 Assiminea
 Astarte
 Astraea
  Astralium
 †Astralium phoebium
 Astrangia
 †Astrohippus
 Astyris
 †Astyris lunata
 Athleta
 Atractosteus
 †Atractosteus spatula
 Atrina
 Attiliosa
 †Attiliosa aldridgei
 †Aturia
 Atys
 Axelella
 Aythya
  †Aythya affinis
 †Aythya americana
 †Aythya collaris
 †Aythya marila
 †Aythya valisineria
 †Aztlanolagus
 †Babelomurex
 Bactridium
 Bailya
 †Bailya intricata
 Baiomys
 Bairdiella
 †Bairdiella chrysoura
 Balaenoptera
  †Balaenoptera acutorostrata
 Balanus
 †Balanus improvisus – or unidentified related form
 †Balanus trigonus
 Balistes
 Barbatia
 †Barbatia candida
  †Barbourofelis
 Bartschella
 Basiliscus – or unidentified comparable form
  †Basilosaurus
 †Basilosaurus cetoides
 Batillaria
 †Batrachosauroides
 Bela
 †Bela nassoides – type locality for species
 †Benzoin
 †Benzoin melissaefolium – or unidentified comparable form
 Biomphalaria
 †Biomphalaria havanensis
 Bison
  †Bison antiquus
  †Bison latifrons
 Bittiolum
 †Bittiolum varium
 Bittium
 Bivetopsia
 Blarina
 †Blarina brevicauda
 †Blarina carolinensis
  †Blastomeryx
 Boa
 †Boa constrictor – type locality for species
 Bonasa
 †Bonasa umbellus
 Boonea
 †Boonea seminuda
  †Borophagus
 †Borophagus diversidens
 †Borophagus hilli
 †Borophagus orc
 †Borophagus pugnator
 Bostrycapulus
 †Bostrycapulus aculeatus
 Botaurus
 †Botaurus lentiginosus
 †Bothriodon
 Botula
 †Botula fusca
 Brachidontes
 †Brachidontes exustus
  †Brachycythara
 †Brachycythara dasa – type locality for species
 †Brana
 Branta
 †Branta canadensis
 †Brasenia
 Bubo
 †Bubo virginianus
 Buccella
 Buccinum
 Bucephala
 †Bucephala albeola
 Buchema
 Bufo
  †Bufo quercicus
 †Bufo terrestris
 †Bufo woodhousei
 Bulimulus
 Bulla
 †Bulla striata
 Bullaria
 Bursa
 †Bursa rhodostoma
 †Bursa rugosa
 Busycon
 †Busycon carica
  †Busycon contrarium
 †Busycon perversum
 †Busycon sinistrum
 Busycotypus
 †Busycotypus canaliculatus
 Buteo
 †Buteo jamaicensis
 †Buteo lineatus
  †Buteo platypterus
 †Buteo swainsoni
 Buteogallus
 †Buteogallus fragilis
 †Buteogallus urubitinga
 Butorides
  †Butorides virescens
 Cadulus
 Caecum
 †Caecum cinctum
 †Caecum circumvolutum
 †Caecum cooperi
 †Caecum cycloferum
 †Caecum floridanum
 †Caecum imbricatum
 †Caecum pulchellum
 †Caecum regulare
 †Caecum strigosum
 Calidris
 †Calidris canutus – or unidentified comparable form
  †Calidris pusilla – or unidentified comparable form
 †Calippus
 Callianassa
 Calliostoma
 †Calliostoma euglyptum
 †Calliostoma jujubinum
 †Calliostoma pulchrum
 †Calliostoma roseolum
  †Calliostoma tampaense
 †Calliostoma yucatecanum – or unidentified comparable form
 Callista
 †Callophoca
 Calotrophon
 †Calotrophon ostrearum
 Calyptraea
 †Calyptraea centralis
  †Camelops
 Cancellaria
 †Cancellaria reticulata
 Cancilla
 Canis
 †Canis armbrusteri
  †Canis dirus – type locality for species
 †Canis edwardii
 †Canis familiaris
 †Canis latrans
 †Canis lepophagus
 †Canis lupus
 †Canis rufus
 Cantharus
 Capella
  †Capromeryx
 Capulus
 Caracara
 †Caracara cheriway
 †Caracara plancus
 Caranx
 †Caranx hippos
 Carcharhinus
 †Carcharhinus brevipinna
 †Carcharhinus leucas
 †Carcharhinus limbatus
 †Carcharhinus plumbeus
 †Carcharhinus signatus
 Carcharias
 †Carcharias taurus
 Carcharodon
  †Carcharodon carcharias
  †Carcharodon hastalis
 Cardinalis
 †Cardinalis cardinalis
 Cardita
 Carditamera
 Caretta
 †Caretta caretta
 †Carex
 Carinodrillia
 †Carpella
 Carphophis
 †Carphophis amoenus
 †Carpocyon
  Carya
 Carychium
 †Casmerodius
 †Casmerodius albus
 Cassidulina
 Cassis
 †Cassis madagascariensis
 Castanea
 Castor
 †Castor californicus
 †Castor canadensis
  †Castoroides
 †Castoroides leiseyorum – type locality for species
 †Castoroides ohioensis
 Cathartes
 †Cathartes aura
 Catharus
 Centropomus
 Cerastoderma
 †Cerion
  Cerithidea
 †Cerithidea pliculosa
 †Cerithidea scalariformis
 Cerithioclava
 Cerithiopsis
 †Cerithiopsis aralia
 †Cerithiopsis greenii
 †Cerithiopsis vinca
  Cerithium
 †Cerithium atratum
 †Cerithium eburneum
 †Cerithium georgianum – or unidentified related form
 †Cerithium guinaicum
 †Cerithium lutosum
 †Cerithium muscarum
 Cerodrillia
 †Cerodrillia simpsoni
 Ceryle
 Chaetopleura
  †Chaetopleura apiculata
 Chama
 †Chama congregata
 †Chama macerophylla
 Chamelea
 Charadrius
 †Charadrius vociferus
  †Chasmaporthetes
 Cheilea
 Chelonia
 †Chelonia mydas
 Chelonibia
 †Chelonibia testudinaria
 Chelydra
 †Chelydra serpentina
 Chemnitzia
 †Chesapecten
 †Chesapecten jeffersonius
 Chicoreus
 †Chicoreus brevifrons
 †Chicoreus dilectus
  Chilomycterus
 Chione
 †Chione cancellata
 Chlamys
 Chlorostoma
 Chondestes – or unidentified comparable form
 †Chondestes grammacus
 Chrysallida
 Chrysemys
 †Chrysemys floridana
 Cibicides
 Ciconia
  †Ciconia maltha
 Cidaris
 Cinctura
 †Cinctura hunteria
 †Cinctura lilium
 Circulus
 Circus
 †Circus cyaneus – or unidentified comparable form
 Cirsotrema
 Cistothorus
 †Cistothorus platensis
 Cladocora
 Clangula
  †Clangula hyemalis
 Clathrodrillia
 Clathrus
 Clava
 Clavatula
 Clavus
 Clementia
 Closia
  Clypeaster
 Cnemidophorus
 †Cnemidophorus sexlineatus
 Coccyzus
 †Coccyzus americanus
 Cochlespira
 Cochliolepis
 Codakia
 †Codakia orbicularis
 Colaptes
  †Colaptes auratus
 Colinus
  †Colinus virginianus
 Colpophyllia
 †Colpophyllia natans
 Coluber
 †Coluber constrictor
 Columba
 †Columba fasciata
 Columbella
 †Columbella mercatoria
 †Columbella rusticoides
 Columbellopsis
 †Columbellopsis nycteis – or unidentified comparable form
 Compsodrillia
  Concavus
 †Concholepas
 Conepatus
 †Conepatus leuconotus
 Conomitra
 †Conorbis
 Conus
  †Conus anabathrum
 †Conus daucus
 †Conus delessertii
 †Conus eversoni – or unidentified comparable form
 †Conus jaspideus – type locality for species
 †Conus miamiensis
 †Conus patglicksteinae
 †Conus patricius
 †Conus sennottorum
 †Conus spurius
 Coragyps
 †Coragyps atratus
 †Coragyps occidentalis
 Coralliophila
 Corbula
  †Cormocyon
  †Cormohipparion
 Corvus
 †Corvus brachyrhynchos
 †Corvus ossifragus
 †Corylus
 Coturnicops
 †Coturnicops noveboracensis
 †Crassinella lunulata
 Crassispira
  Crassostrea
 †Crassostrea virginica
 †Cremaster – type locality for genus
 †Cremaster
 Crenella
 Crepidula
 †Crepidula convexa
  †Crepidula fornicata
 †Crepidula maculosa
 †Crepidula plana
 Crepipatella
 †Crommium
 Crotalus
  †Crotalus adamanteus
 †Crotalus giganteus
 Crucibulum
 †Crucibulum auricula
 †Crucibulum spinosum
 †Crucibulum striatum
 Cryptotis
 †Cryptotis parva
 †Ctena orbiculata
 Cumingia
 Cupuladria
 Cupularia
  †Cuvieronius
 †Cuvieronius tropicus
 Cyanocitta
 †Cyanocitta cristata
 Cyclocardia
 Cygnus
 †Cygnus buccinator
  †Cygnus columbianus
 Cylichna
 †Cymakra
 †Cymakra poncei
 Cymatium
 Cymatosyrinx
 Cymbovula
 †Cymbovula acicularis
 Cymodocea
 †Cynarctoides
 †Cynarctoides lemur
  †Cynelos
 Cynoscion
  †Cynthiacetus
 Cyphoma
 †Cyphoma gibbosum
 †Cyphoma intermedium
 Cypraea
 Cypraecassis
 Cypraedia
 †Cyrenoida floridana
 †Cyrtopleura costata
 Cythara
 †Cythara anthera
 Daedalochila
 †Daedalochila uvulifera
 Daphnella
 †Daphnella elata
  †Daphoenodon
  †Daphoenus – tentative report
 Dasyatis
 Dasypus
  †Dasypus bellus – type locality for species
 Dauciconus
 Deirochelys
 †Deirochelys reticularia
 Dendraster
 Dendrocopos
 Dendrocygna
 †Dendrogyra
 †Dendrogyra cylindrus
 Dendropoma
 †Dendropoma irregulare
 Dentalium
 Dentimargo
 †Dentimargo aureocinctus
 †Dentimargo eburneolus
 Dermomurex
 †Dermomurex antecessor
 †Dermomurex elizabethae
 †Desmatippus
 †Desmocyon
  Desmodus
 †Desmodus stocki
 Diadophis
 †Diadophis punctatus
 Diastoma
 Dicathais
  †Diceratherium – or unidentified comparable form
 Dichocoenia
 †Dichocoenia stokesi
 Didelphis
 †Didelphis marsupialis
 †Didelphis virginiana
 †Didianema
 †Didianema pauli
 Dinocardium
 †Dinocardium robustum
 †Dinohippus
  †Dinohyus
 Diodon
 Diodora
 †Diodora cayenensis
 †Diodora meta
 †Diodora sayi
 †Diplodonta punctata
 †Diplodonta semiaspera
 Diploria
  †Diploria labyrinthiformis
 †Dipoides
 Discinisca
 †Discohelix
 Discorbis
 Distorsio
 †Distorsio mcgintyi – type locality for species
 †Divaricella dentata
 Dolabella
 †Dolicholatirus
 Donax
 †Donax fossor
  †Donax variabilis
 †Dorypaltus – type locality for genus
 †Dorypaltus prosphatus – type locality for species
 Dosinia
 †Dosinia discus
 Drymarchon
 †Drymarchon corais
 Dryocopus
 Dumetella
 †Dumetella carolinensis
 Echinocardium
 Echinometra
 †Echinometra lucunter
 †Ecphora
 †Ectopistes
  †Ectopistes migratorius
 Egretta
 †Egretta thula
 †Egretta tricolor – or unidentified comparable form
 Elaphe
 †Elaphe guttata
 †Elaphe obsoleta
 Eleutherodactylus – or unidentified comparable form
 †Elliptoideus
  Elphidium
 Emarginula
 Enaeta
 Engina
 †Engoniophos
 †Enhydritherium terraenovae – type locality for species
 †Enhydrocyon
 Ensis
 †Ensis directus
 †Ensis minor
  †Epicyon
 †Epicyon haydeni
 Epitonium
 †Epitonium humphreysii
 †Epitonium novangliae
 Eptesicus
 †Eptesicus fuscus
 Equetus
 Equus
 †Equus fraternus
 †Equus giganteus
 Eratoidea
  †Eremotherium
 †Eremotherium laurillardi
 Erethizon
 †Erethizon dorsatum
 Eretmochelys
 †Ereunetes
 Erolia
 Ervilia
 Erycina – tentative report
 Erycina
  Eubalaena
 Eucidaris
 †Eucidaris tribuloides
 †Eucrassatella speciosa
  †Eucyon
 †Eucyon davisi
 Eudocimus
 †Eudocimus albus
 †Eudolium
 Eugeniconus
 Euglandina
 †Euglandina rosea
 Eulima
 †Eulima bifasciata
 Eulithidium
 †Eulithidium thalassicola
 Eumeces
 †Eumeces fasciatus
 †Eumeces inexpectatus
 Eumops – type locality for genus
  †Eumops glaucinus – type locality for species
 †Euoplocyon
 Euphagus
  †Euphagus cyanocephalus
 Eupleura
 †Eupleura caudata
 †Eupleura sulcidentata
 †Eupleura tampaensis
 Eusmilia
 †Eusmilia fastigiata
 Euspira
 Euvola
 †Euvola raveneli
 †Euvola ziczac
 Fabella
 Falco
  †Falco columbarius
 †Falco peregrinus
 †Falco sparverius
 Farancia
 †Farancia abacura
 Fasciolaria
 †Fasciolaria tulipa
 Favartia
 †Favartia cellulosa
 Favia
 †Favia fragum
  Favites
 Felis
 Fenimorea
 †Fenimorea fucata
 †Fenimorea moseri
 †Fenimorea pagodula
 Ferrissia
 Ficus
 †Ficus communis
 Fimbria
 Finella
 †Finella adamsi
 †Finella dubia
  Fissurella
 Flabellum
   †Florida
 †Florida caerulea
 †Floridaceras
 †Floridachoerus
 †Floridatragulus
 Fontigens – report made of unidentified related form or using admittedly obsolete nomenclature
 Fossaria
 †Fossaria cubensis
 Fossarus
  Fragum
 Fulgurofusus
  Fulguropsis
 †Fulguropsis feldmanni
 †Fulica
 †Fulica americana
  †Fundulus
 Fusinus
 Fusiturricula
 Gadila
 †Galaxea
 Galeocerdo
 †Galeocerdo aduncus
 †Galeocerdo contortus
  †Galeocerdo cuvier
 Gallinago
 †Gallinago gallinago
 Gallinula
 †Gallinula brodkorbi – type locality for species
 †Gallinula chloropus
 †Gambusia
  †Gambusia affinis
 Gari
 Gastrochaena
 Gastrocopta
 †Gastrocopta contracta
 †Gastrocopta pentodon
 Gastrophryne
 †Gastrophryne carolinensis
 Gavia
 †Gavia immer
 †Gavia pacifica
  †Gavialosuchus – type locality for genus
 †Gavialosuchus americanus
 Gegania
 Gemma
 †Gemma gemma
 Gemmula
 Gemophos
 †Gemophos tinctus
 Genota
 †Gentilicamelus – or unidentified comparable form
  Geochelone
 Geomys
 †Geomys pinetis
 †Geothlypis
 †Geothlypis trichas
 Geranoaetus
 Gibberula
  †Gigantopecten
 †Gigantostrea
 Ginglymostoma
 †Ginglymostoma cirratum
 Glans
 Glaucidium
 Glaucomys
 Globicephala
 †Globicephala macrorhynchus – type locality for species
 Globigerina
 Globularia
 Globulina
  †Glossotherium
 Glycymeris
 †Glycymeris americana
 †Glycymeris decussata
 Glyphostoma
 Glyphyalinia
 Glyptoactis
  †Glyptotherium
 †Gomphotherium
 †Goniodelphis – type locality for genus
 Goniopora
 Gopherus
  †Gopherus polyphemus
 †Granoturris
 †Granoturris padolina
 Granulina
 Graptemys
  †Graptemys barbouri – or unidentified comparable form
 Gregariella
 †Gregariella coralliophaga
 Grus
 †Grus americana
 †Grus canadensis
 †Guara
 Guttulina
 Gymnogyps
  †Gymnogyps californianus
 Gyraulus
 †Gyraulus parvus
 †Hadrodelphis
 Haematopus – type locality for genus
 †Haematopus palliatus – type locality for species
 Haemulon
 Haliaeetus
 †Haliaeetus leucocephalus
 †Haliaetus
  †Halichoeres
 †Halimeda
 Halodule
 Haminoea
 Harengula
 Hastula
 Haustellum
 Hawaiia
 Heilprinia
 Heliaster
  †Heliaster microbrachius
 Helicina
 Helisoma
  Heloderma – tentative report
 †Hemiauchenia
 †Hemiauchenia macrocephala
 Hemipristis
 †Hemipristis serra
 Here
 †Herodias
  †Herpetotherium
 Hespererato
 †Hespererato maugeriae
 Hesperisternia
 †Hesperisternia multangulus
 †Hesperotestudo
 Heterodon
 †Heterodon platyrhinos
 †Heterodon simus
 †Hexameryx – type locality for genus
 Hexaplex
 †Hexaplex fulvescens
 Hiatella
  †Hiatella arctica
 Himantopus
 Himerometra
 Hindsia
 Hindsiclava
  †Hipparion
 Hipponix
 †Hippotherium
  †Holmesina
 †Homiphoca
 Homo
 †Homo sapiens
  †Homotherium
 †Homotherium serum
 †Humboldtiana – tentative report
 Hyalina
 Hydrobia – report made of unidentified related form or using admittedly obsolete nomenclature
 Hydrochoerus
 Hyla
 †Hyla cinerea
 †Hyla femoralis
  †Hyla gratiosa
 Hylocichla – or unidentified comparable form
 †Hylocichla mustelina
 Hyotissa
  †Hypohippus
 †Hypolagus
 Ictalurus
 †Ictalurus catus – or unidentified comparable form
 Ilex
 †Ilex glabra
 Ilyanassa
  †Indarctos
 †Inodrillia
 †Inodrillia aepynota
 Ischnochiton
 Isognomon
 †Isognomon alatus
 †Isognomon radiatus – tentative report
 Isophyllia
 †Isophyllia sinuosa
 Isurus
  †Isurus oxyrinchus
 Ithycythara
 †Ithycythara lanceolata
 †Ithycythara psila
 Ixobrychus
 †Ixobrychus exilis
  Jabiru
 †Jabiru mycteria – type locality for species
 Jacana
 †Jacana spinosa
 Japonactaeon
 †Japonactaeon punctostriatus
 Jaspidella
 †Jaspidella jaspidea – tentative report
 †Jenkinsia – or unidentified comparable form
 Jenneria
 †Jordanella
  †Jordanella floridae
 Julia
 Junco
 †Junco hyemalis
 Kinosternon
 †Kinosternon subrubrum
 Knefastia
 †Kogiopsis – type locality for genus
 †Kogiopsis floridana – type locality for species
  Kuphus
 Kurtziella
 †Kurtziella cerina
 †Kurtziella limonitella
 †Kurtziella serta
 †Kyptoceras
 †Lachnolaimus
  †Lachnolaimus maximus
 †Lactophrys
 Laevapex
 Laevicardium
 †Laevicardium mortoni
 Lagena
 †Lagodon
 †Lagodon rhomboides
 †Laguna
 Lampropeltis
 †Lampropeltis getulus
 Lanius
 †Lanius ludovicianus
 Larus
 Lasiurus
 †Lasiurus borealis
 †Lasiurus intermedius
 Laterallus
  †Laterallus exilis – or unidentified comparable form
 Latirus
 †Latirus jucundus
 †Latirus maxwelli
 Leiocephalus – tentative report
 Leiostomus
 †Leiostomus xanthurus
 †Leitneria
 †Leitneria floridana
 Leopardus
  †Leopardus pardalis
 †Leopardus wiedii
 Lepidochelys
 Lepisosteus
 Lepomis
 †Lepomis gulosus – or unidentified comparable form
 †Lepomis microlophus
  †Leptocyon – tentative report
 Lepus
 †Lepus townsendii – or unidentified comparable form
 †Leucophoyx thula
 Lima
 Limaria
 Limatula
 †Limatula subauriculata
 Limnodromus
 †Limnodromus scolopaceus
 †Limosa
 Linatella
  †Linatella caudata
 Linga
 Lioglyphostoma
 Liotia
 †Liquidambar
 Lithophaga
 †Lithophaga antillarum
 †Lithophaga aristata – tentative report
 †Lithophaga bisulcata
 †Lithophaga nigra
 Lithophyllum
 Lithopoma
  †Lithopoma americanum
 Lithothamnion
 Litiopa
 Littoraria
 †Littoraria angulifera
 †Littoraria irrorata
 Littorina
 Lobatus
 †Lobatus costatus
 †Lobatus gigas
 †Lobatus raninus
 Longchaeus
 †Longchaeus suturalis
 Lontra
  †Lontra canadensis
 Lophelia
 †Lophelia prolifera
 †Lophocetus – or unidentified related form
 Lophodytes
  †Lophodytes cucullatus
 Lottia
 Lovenia
 Lucapina
 †Lucapina sowerbii
 †Lucapina suffusa
 Lucapinella
 †Lucapinella limatula
  Lucina
 †Lucina pensylvanica
  Luidia
 Luria
 †Lutjanus
 Lynx
 †Lynx rufus
 Lyria
 Lytechinus
 †Lytechinus variegatus
  †Machairodus
 Macoma
 †Macoma tenta
 Macrocallista
 †Macrocallista maculata
 †Macrocallista nimbosa
 Macrochelys
 †Macrochelys temminckii
 Macrocypraea
 †Macrocypraea cervus
  Mactra
 Madrepora
 †Madrepora oculata
 Magilus
 Magnolia
 †Magnolia virginiana
 Malaclemys
 †Malaclemys terrapin
 Malea
 †Mammacyon
 †Mammut
  †Mammut americanum
 †Mammut matthewi
 †Mammuthus
  †Mammuthus columbi – type locality for species
 Manicina
 †Manicina areolata
 Maoricrypta
 †Maoricrypta costata
 Margaretta
 †Margaritaria
 Margarites
  Marginella
 Marsupina
 †Marsupina bufo
 Martesia
 Massyla
 Masticophis
 †Masticophis flagellum
 Meandrina
 †Meandrina meandrites
 Megabalanus
 †Megabalanus tintinnabulum
 Megaceryle
 †Megaceryle alcyon
  †Megahippus
 †Megalictis
 †Megalonyx
 †Megalonyx jeffersonii
  †Megalonyx leptostomus
 †Megalonyx wheatleyi
 Megalops
 †Megalops atlanticus
  †Megantereon
 Megaptera
 Meioceras
 †Meioceras nitidum
 Melampus
 †Melampus bidentatus
 †Melampus coffea
  Melanella
 †Melanella conoidea
 Melanerpes
  †Melanerpes carolinus
 †Melanerpes erythrocephalus
 Meleagris
  †Meleagris gallopavo – type locality for species
 †Mellita quinquiesperforata
 Melongena
 †Melongena bispinosa
 †Melongena corona
 †Melongena melongena
 Melospiza
 †Melospiza georgiana
 †Melospiza melodia
 Membranipora – or unidentified comparable form
  †Menoceras
 Menticirrhus
 Mephitis
 †Mephitis mephitis
 Mercenaria
 †Mercenaria mercenaria
 Meretrix
 Mergus
 †Mergus merganser
 †Mergus serrator
  †Merychippus
 †Merycoidodon
 Mesoplodon
 †Mesoreodon
 †Metatomarctus
  †Metaxytherium – type locality for genus
 Metula
 Microdrillia
 Microhyla
 Micropogonias
 Micropora
 Micropterus
 †Micropterus salmoides
 Microtus
 †Microtus pennsylvanicus
  †Microtus pinetorum
 Micrurus
 †Micrurus fulvius
 Millepora
 †Millepora alcicornis
 Milvago
 †Milvago chimachima
 †Mimus
  †Mimus polyglottos
 †Miohippus
 †Miopetaurista
  †Miracinonyx
 †Miracinonyx inexpectatus
 Mitra
 †Mitra semiferruginea
 Mitrella
 Mitromorpha
 †Mitromorpha dormitor
 Modiolus
  †Modiolus americanus
 Modulus
 †Modulus calusa
 †Modulus carchedonius
  †Modulus modulus
 Molothrus
  †Molothrus ater
 Monilispira
 Monoplex
 †Monoplex krebsii
 †Monoplex parthenopeus
 †Monostiolum
 Mormoops
 †Mormoops megalophylla
  †Moropus
 †Morum oniscus
 Morus
 Mugil
 †Mulina
 Mulinia
 †Mulinia lateralis
 Murex
 Murexiella
 †Murexiella glypta
 †Murexiella macgintyi – type locality for species
 Murexsul
  Muricanthus
 Muricopsis
 Musculium
 Musculus
 †Musculus lateralis
 Mussa
  †Mussa angulosa
 Mussismilia
 Mustela
 †Mustela frenata
 †Mya
 †Mya arenaria
 Mycetophyllia
 Mycteria
 †Mycteria americana
 †Mylagaulus
 Myliobatis
  †Mylodon
  †Mylohyus
 †Mylohyus elmorei
 †Mylohyus floridanus – type locality for species
 †Mylohyus fossilis – type locality for species
 Myotis
 †Myotis austroriparius
 †Myotis grisescens
 Myrica
 †Myrica cerifera
 Mytilopsis
 †Mytilopsis leucophaeata
 Mytilus
  †Nannippus
 Nannodiella
 †Nanosiren – type locality for genus
 †Nanosiren garciae – type locality for species
 †Nanotragulus
 Narona
 Nassa – report made of unidentified related form or using admittedly obsolete nomenclature
 Nassarina
 †Nassarina glypta
  Nassarius
 †Nassarius acutus
 †Nassarius antillarum
 †Nassarius consensus – or unidentified comparable form
 †Nassarius vibex
  Nasua – or unidentified comparable form
 Natica
 Naticarius
 †Naticarius canrena
 Natrix
 †Natrix cyclopion
 †Natrix erythrogaster – or unidentified comparable form
 Necturus
 Negaprion
 †Negaprion brevirostris
 †Neochoerus
 †Neochoerus aesopi
 †Neochoerus pinckneyi
 Neofiber
 †Neofiber alleni
  †Neohipparion
 Neomonachus
 †Neomonachus tropicalis
 Neophrontops
 Neotoma
 †Neotoma floridana
 Nerita
 Neritina
 †Neritina usnea
  †Neritina virginea
 †Neritopsis
 Nerodia
 †Nerodia fasciata
 †Nerodia sipedon
 †Nerodia taxispilota – or unidentified comparable form
 Nesovitrea
 †Nettion crecca
 Neverita
  †Nimravides
 Niso
 Nitidella
 †Nitidella nitida
 Niveria
 †Niveria quadripunctata
 †Niveria suffusa
 Nodipecten
 †Nodipecten nodosus
 †Nothokemas
  †Nothrotheriops
 Notophthalmus
 †Notophthalmus viridescens
  Notorynchus
 †Nototamias
 Nucula
 †Nucula proxima
 †Nuculana acuta
 Numenius
 †Numenius americanus
 Nummulites
 Nyctanassa
  †Nyctanassa violacea – type locality for species
 Nycticeius
 †Nycticeius humeralis
 Nycticorax
 †Nycticorax nycticorax
 †Nyssa
 Ochrotomys
 †Ochrotomys nuttalli
 Oculina
 †Oculina diffusa
 Odocoileus
  †Odocoileus virginianus
  Odontaspis
 Odostomia
 †Odostomia acutidens
 †Odostomia laevigata
 Olar
 †Oligobunis
 Oliva
 †Oliva reticularis
  †Oliva sayana
 Olivella
 †Olivella dealbata
 †Olivella floralia
 †Olivella mutica
 †Olivella pusilla
  Ondatra
 †Ondatra zibethicus
 Onoba
 †Ontocetus
 †Ontocetus emmonsi
 Onustus
 Opalia
 Opheodrys
 †Opheodrys aestivus
 Ophidion
  †Ophiomorpha
 Ophisaurus
 †Ophisaurus compressus
 †Ophisaurus ventralis
 †Opsanus
 Orbicella
 †Orbicella annularis
 Orthogeomys
 Orthopristis
 Oryzomys
 †Oryzomys palustris
 †Osbornodon
 †Osbornodon iamonensis
 †Oscilla
 Ostrea
 †Ostrea compressirostra
 †Ostrea equestris
 †Otodus
  †Otodus megalodon
 Otus
 †Otus asio
  †Oxydactylus – tentative report
 †Oxyura
 †Oxyura jamaicensis
 †Pachyarmatherium
 †Pachyarmatherium leiseyi – type locality for species
 †Palaeogale
 †Palaeolama
 †Palaeophis
 †Palaeophoyx columbiana – type locality for species
 †Pandanaris
 Pandion
 †Pandion haliaetus
 Pandora
 Panopea
 Panthera
  †Panthera leo
 †Panthera onca
 Papyridea
 †Papyridea soleniformis
  †Parahippus
 †Parahippus leonensis – type locality for species
 Parametaria
  †Paramylodon
 †Paramylodon harlani
 Parastarte
 †Parastarte triquetra
 †Parotodus
 Parvanachis
 †Parvanachis obesa
 Parviturbo
 Passerculus
 †Passerculus sandwichensis
  Passerella – or unidentified comparable form
  Passerina – or unidentified comparable form
 Patelloida
 †Patelloida pustulata
  Pecari
 Pecten
 †Pedalion
 †Pediomeryx
 Pelecanus
 †Pelecanus erythrorhynchos – or unidentified comparable form
 †Pelecanus schreiberi
  †Peltosaurus
 Peneroplis
 Periglypta
 Peristernia
 Perna
 Perognathus
 Peromyscus
 †Peromyscus gossypinus
 †Peromyscus polionotus
 Peronella
 †Perplicaria
 Persicula
 Persististrombus
  Petaloconchus
 †Petaloconchus floridanus
 †Petaloconchus varians
 Petricola
  †Petrolisthes
 Phalacrocorax
 †Phalacrocorax auritus
 Phalium
 †Phlaocyon
 †Phlaocyon achoros
 †Phoberocyon
 †Phocanella
 Phoenicopterus
 †Phoenicopterus copei
  †Phoenicopterus ruber
 Pholadomya
 Phos
 Phrontis
 †Phrontis vibex
 Phyllonotus
 †Phyllonotus globosus
 †Phyllonotus pomum
  Physa
 Physella
 †Physella heterostropha
 †Physeterula
 †Physogaleus
 †Physogaleus contortus
 Pica
  †Pica pica
 Picoides
 †Picoides villosus – or unidentified comparable form
 Pilsbryspira
 †Pilsbryspira leucocyma
 Pinctada
 Pinna
 Pinus
 †Pinus caribaea
  †Pinus taeda
 Pipilo
 †Pipilo erythrophthalmus
 Pipistrellus
 †Pipistrellus subflavus
 Pisania
  †Piscobalaena
 †Pistia
 Pitar
 †Pitar cordatus
 †Pitar morrhuanus
 Pituophis
 †Pituophis melanoleucus
 Pitymys
 †Planorbella
 †Planorbella duryi
 Planorbis
  †Platybelodon
  †Platygonus
 †Platygonus compressus
 †Platylepas
 Plecotus
 †Plecotus rafinesquii
 Plegadis
 Plethodon
 †Plethodon glutinosus
 †Pleurodonte
 Pleurofusia
 †Pleurofusia dowlingi
 Pleuromeris
 †Pleuromeris tridentata
 Pleuroploca
 Plicatula
 †Plicatula gibbosa
 †Pliocyon
  †Pliohippus
 †Pliometanastes
 †Plionarctos
  †Plithocyon – or unidentified comparable form
 Pocillopora
 Podiceps
 †Podiceps auritus
 Podilymbus
 †Podilymbus podiceps
 Podomys
 †Podomys floridanus
 †Poecilia
 †Poecilia latipinna
 Pogonias
 †Pogonias cromis
  Poirieria
 Polinices
 †Polinices hepaticus
 †Polinices lacteus
 Polygireulima
 Polygonum
 Polygyra
 †Polygyra cereolus
 †Polygyra septemvolva
 Polyschides
 Polystira
 †Polystira albida
 Pomacea
  †Pomacea paludosa
 Pomatodelphis
  Porites
 †Porites astreoides
 †Porites furcata
 †Porites porites
 †Porphyrula martinica
 Portunus
 Porzana
 †Porzana carolina
 †Potamides
 Prionotus
 Pristis
  †Procamelus
  †Procranioceras
 Procyon
 †Procyon lotor – type locality for species
 †Prosynthetoceras
 †Protocardia
 †Protohippus
 †Protosiren
 Prunum
 †Prunum amabile
 †Prunum apicinum
 †Prunum bellum
 †Prunum guttatum
 †Prunum roscidum
 Psammechinus
  †Psephophorus
 Pseudacris
 †Pseudacris ornata
 Pseudemys
 †Pseudemys concinna
 †Pseudemys floridana
 †Pseudemys nelsoni
  †Pseudhipparion
  †Pseudobranchus
  Pseudochama
  Pseudodiploria
 Pseudosuccinea
 †Pseudosuccinea columella
 Pseudotorinia
 Pseudozonaria
 Psilaxis
 Pteria
 †Pteria colymbus
 Pterocarya
 Pteromeris
 †Pteromeris perplana
 Pteropurpura
 Pterorytis
 Pterotyphis
 †Pterotyphis triangularis
 Pterynotus
 †Pterynotus phyllopterus
 †Pterynotus pinnatus
 †Ptychosalpinx
 Puffinus
 †Puffinus puffinus
 Pugnus
  †Puma
 †Puma concolor
 Pupoides
 Purpura
 Pusula
 †Pusula pediculus
 Pycnodonte
 Pygmaepterys
 Pyramidella
 Pyrazus
 Pyrgocythara
 †Pyrgocythara plicosa
 Pyrgospira
 †Pyrgospira ostrearum
  †Pyrgospira tampaensis
 †Pyruconus
 Quercus
 †Quercus brevifolia
 †Quercus laurifolia
 †Quercus virginiana
 Querquedula
 †Querquedula discors
 Quinqueloculina
 Quiscalus
  †Quiscalus major
 †Quiscalus mexicanus
 †Quiscalus quiscula
 Rallus
 †Rallus elegans
 †Rallus limicola
 †Rallus longirostris
 †Rana
 †Rana capito
 †Rana catesbeiana
  †Rana grylio
 †Rana pipiens
 Rangia
 Rapana
 Recurvirostra
 †Recurvirostra americana
 †Regina – or unidentified comparable form
 †Regina alleni
 Reithrodontomys
 †Reithrodontomys humulis
  Reteporella
 Retilaskeya
 †Retilaskeya bicolor
 Retusa – tentative report
 Rhadinaea
 †Rhadinaea flavilata
 †Rhegminornis
 Rhineura
  †Rhineura floridana
 Rhinoclavis
 Rhinoptera
 †Rhinoptera bonasus
 Rhizoprionodon
 †Rhizoprionodon terraenovae
  †Rhynchotherium
 Rictaxis
 Rimella
 Rimula
 Ringicula
 Rissoa
 Rissoina
 †Rissoina floridana
 †Rissoina sagraiana
 †Rissoina striatocostata
 Rostellaria
 †Rotalia
 Ruppia – or unidentified related form
 Sabal
  †Sabal palmetto
 †Saccharoturris
 †Saccharoturris centrodes – type locality for species
 Sardinella
 Sassia
 †Satherium
 †Satherium piscinarium
 †Scala
  †Scaldicetus
 Scalopus
 †Scalopus aquaticus
 Scaphander
 Scapharca
 Scaphella
 †Scaphella junonia
 Scaphiopus
 †Scaphiopus holbrooki
  †Scaphiopus holbrookii
 Schizaster
 Schizoporella
 †Sciadopitys
 Sciurus
  †Sciurus carolinensis
 †Sciurus niger
 Scolopax
 †Scolopax minor
 Scolymia
 †Scolymia lacera
 Sconsia
 †Scutella
 Sedilia
 †Sedilia aphanitoma
 Seila
 †Seila adamsii
 Semele
 Semicassis
  †Semicassis granulata
 †Seminoleconus
 †Seraphs
 †Serenoa
 †Serenoa serrulata
  Serpula
 Serpulorbis
 †Serpulorbis decussatus
 Siderastrea
 †Siderastrea radians
 †Siderastrea siderea
 Sigatica
 †Sigatica semisulcata
 Sigmodon
 †Sigmodon hispidus
 Simnia
 Simnialena
  Sinum
 †Sinum perspectivum
 Siphonochelus
 †Siren
 †Siren hesterna – type locality for species
  †Siren lacertina
 †Siren simpsoni – type locality for species
 Sistrurus
 †Sistrurus miliarius
 Smaragdia
 †Smaragdia viridis
  †Smilodon
 †Smilodon fatalis
 †Smilodon gracilis
 Solariella
 Solecurtus
 Solen
 Solenosteira
 †Solenosteira cancellaria
 Somateria
  †Somateria spectabilis – or unidentified comparable form
 Sorex
 †Sorex longirostris
 Sorites
  Spatula
 †Speotyto cunicularia
 Spermophilus
 Sphyraena
 †Sphyraena barracuda
  Sphyrna
 Spilogale
 †Spilogale putorius
 †Spiraxis – tentative report
 Spirorbis
 Spisula
 Spizaetus
 Spizella
 †Spizella passerina
 †Spizella pusilla
 Splendrillia
 Spondylus
  †Spondylus americanus
  †Squalodon – tentative report
 †Stellifer
 Stercorarius
 Sternotherus
 Stewartia
 †Stewartia floridana
 Sthenictis
 Stigmaulax
 Stilosoma
 Storeria
 †Storeria dekayi
 Stramonita
  †Striatolamia
 Strioterebrum
 Strix
 †Strix varia
 Strobilops
 Strombiformis
 Strombina
 Strombus
  †Strombus alatus
 †Strombus pugilis
 †Strombus raninus
 Sturnella
  †Sturnella magna
 Stylophora
 Subcancilla
 Sula
 †Syllomus – or unidentified comparable form
 Sylvilagus
 †Sylvilagus floridanus
 †Sylvilagus palustris
 Synaptomys
 Synodus
 †Synodus foetens – or unidentified comparable form
  †Synthetoceras
 †Synthetoceras tricornatus – or unidentified comparable form
 Syntomodrillia
 Syrnola
 Tachybaptus
 †Tachybaptus dominicus
 Tachycineta
 Tadarida
 †Tadarida brasiliensis
 Tagelus
  Talparia
 Tamias
 †Tamias aristus
 Tantilla
 †Tantilla coronata
  Tapirus
 †Tapirus lundeliusi – type locality for species
 †Tapirus polkensis
 †Tapirus veroensis
 †Tapirus webbi – type locality for species
 Taras
 Taxodium
 †Taxodium distichum
 Tectonatica
 †Tectonatica pusilla
 Tegula
 †Tegula fasciata
 Teinostoma
  †Teleoceras
 †Teleoceras proterum
 Telescopium
 Tellina
 Tenagodus
 †Tephrocyon
  †Teratornis
 †Teratornis merriami
 Terebellum
 Terebra
 †Terebra dislocata
 †Terebra protexta
 Teredo
 Terrapene
  †Terrapene carolina
 Testudo
 Textularia
 Thalassia
 †Thalassia testudinum
 Thalassodendron
 Thamnophis
 †Thamnophis sirtalis
 †Thelecythara
 †Thelecythara floridana
 †Theriodictis
  †Thinobadistes
 Thomomys
 Thracia
 Thyasira
 †Thyasira trisinuata
  †Ticholeptus
 Timoclea
  †Titanis – type locality for genus
 †Titanis walleri – type locality for species
 Tocobaga
 Tonna
 †Tonna galea
 Totanus
 Toxostoma
 †Toxostoma rufum
 Trachemys
 †Trachemys scripta
 Trachycardium
 †Trachycardium egmontianum
 †Trachycardium isocardia
 †Trachycardium muricatum
 Trachyphyllia
 Trachypollia
  Tremarctos
 †Tremarctos floridanus
 Trichechus
  †Trichechus manatus
 Tricolia
 †Tricolia umbilicata
 †Trigonictis macrodon
 Trigonostoma
 Triloculina
 †Trinacria
 Tringa
 †Tringa melanoleuca
 †Tringa solitaria
 Triphora
  Triplofusus
 †Triplofusus giganteus
 Tritonoharpa
 †Tritonoharpa lanceolata
 Trivia
 Trochita
 Troglodytes
 †Troglodytes aedon
 Trona
  Trophon
 †Tropidophis – or unidentified comparable form
 Tucetona
 Turbinella
 Turbo
 †Turbo castanea
 Turbonilla
  †Turbonilla hemphilli
 †Turbonilla levis – or unidentified comparable form
 Turdus
 Turritella
 †Turritella apicalis
  Tursiops – or unidentified comparable form
 Tutufa
 Tympanuchus
 †Tympanuchus cupido
 Typhina
 Typhinellus
 Typhis
 Typhlops – tentative report
 Tyrannus
 †Tyrannus tyrannus
 Tyronia
 Tyto
 †Tyto alba
 Ulmus
 †Urocoptis
 Urocyon
  †Urocyon cinereoargenteus
 Urosalpinx
 †Urosalpinx cinerea
 †Urosalpinx perrugata
 Ursus
  †Ursus americanus
 Vasum
 †Vasum horridum
 †Vasum muricatum
 †Velates
 Venericardia
 Ventricolaria
 Venus
 Vermicularia
 †Vermicularia fargoi
 †Vermicularia spirata
 Vermivora
  †Vermivora celata – or unidentified comparable form
 Verticordia
 Vertigo
 †Vertigo milium
 †Vertigo ovata
 Vexillum
 †Vexillum wandoense
 †Viburnum
 †Viburnum dentatum – or unidentified comparable form
 †Viburnum nudum
 †Vireo
 †Vireo griseus
 Vitis
  †Vitis rotundifolia – or unidentified comparable form
 †Vitricythara
 Vitrinella
 Vitularia
 Viviparus
 †Viviparus georgianus
 Vokesimurex
 †Vokesimurex anniae
 †Vokesimurex bellegladeensis
  †Vokesimurex rubidus
 Volsella
 Volutifusus
 Volvarina
 †Volvarina albolineata
 †Volvarina avena
 Vulpes
 †Vulpes vulpes – type locality for species
 †Xanthium
 Xenophora
 †Xenophora conchyliophora
  †Xenosmilus – type locality for genus
 †Xenosmilus hodsonae – type locality for species
 Yoldia
 †Yumaceras
  Zapus
 Zebina
 †Zebina browniana
 †Zebina laevigata
 Zenaida
 †Zenaida macroura
 †Zenaidura
 †Zenaidura macroura
 Zizyphus
 †Zodiolestes
 Zonaria
 Zonitoides
 †Zonitoides arboreus
 Zonotrichia
 †Zonotrichia albicollis – or unidentified comparable form
  †Zonotrichia leucophrys – or unidentified comparable form
 Zonulispira
 †Zonulispira crocata

References
 

Florida